The Place Where We Lived is the sixth album by Canadian singer-songwriter Hayden, released May 26, 2009 on Hardwood Records and Universal Music Canada.

The album was not heavily promoted, and Hayden did not undertake an extensive concert tour to support it. Upon the release of his follow-up album Us Alone, he joked that "I think I realized that you need to let people know you have a record out."

Track listing

References 

 

Hayden (musician) albums
2009 albums